Sar Bala or Sarbala may refer to:
 Sarbala, Kerman
 Sar Bala, Razavi Khorasan
 Sarbala, South Khorasan